Elena "Zamo" Mikhailovna Zamolodchikova (born 19 September 1982) is a Russian former artistic gymnast, and four-time Olympic medallist. She was known for her risky double-twisting double-backflip on floor and was one of only a handful of women to have successfully completed one. In 2015, she was inducted in the International Gymnastics Hall of Fame.

Career
Zamolodchikova began gymnastics at the age of six. In 1999 she participated in her first major senior competition, the World Gymnastics Championships. She won the gold in vault and the bronze in the all-around.

Just days before the 2000 European Championships in Paris, her father died as a result of radiation exposure from the Chernobyl accident. Zamolodchikova led her team to the gold medal and earned individual silvers in the all-around and vault finals and a bronze on the beam.

2000 Summer Olympics 
Zamolodchikova was selected as a member of the Russian gymnastics team at the 2000 Summer Olympics in Sydney. Although initially she did not qualify for the all-around or vault finals, she earned spots in both when Elena Produnova withdrew from the all-around due to injury and Svetlana Khorkina decided to give up her spot to Zamolodchikova due to her better chances of medalling. In the team competition, the Russian team was leading after the preliminary rounds, but four Russian gymnasts made mistakes in the finals, costing them the gold. Zamolodchikova was one of the four, slipping off the beam as she took off for a Rulfova and narrowly missing her head.

After two apparatuses in the all-around, Zamolodchikova was in first place with her stronger exercises still to go, events on which she went on to win Olympic gold. However, she lost her chance of an all-around medal after a fall on her simplest tumbling pass during her floor exercise rotation. On a night where many gymnasts made uncharacteristic errors, she eventually finished 6th. Had she scored the same in the all-around as she did for her team finals performance, her total would have been enough to win her the gold.

Zamolodchikova won gold on both the vault and floor, and became a two-time Olympic champion. During vault finals, Khorkina sat in the stands, cheering loudly for her teammate, to whom she gave her spot. Khorkina was leading in the floor finals until Zamolodchikova performed as both were vying for a second gold.

2002 to 2004 
Zamolodchikova won the 2002 World vault title and a European all-around bronze medal in 2004, in addition to numerous other awards.

Zamolodchikova, also a lieutenant in the Russian Army, competed in her second Olympic games in 2004. The Russian team won a bronze medal, and Zamolodchikova just missed out on an individual vault medal, placing fourth behind Monica Roşu of Romania, Annia Hatch of the United States, and a fellow Russian, Anna Pavlova.

2005 
At the 2005 World Championships in Melbourne, she placed fourth in both vault and floor finals. In the floor finals, she performed four extremely difficult tumbling passes, landing each one cleanly, but did not successfully compete all of her dance combinations. Her start value was lowered as a result from 10.0 to 9.7, and she scored a 9.162, placing her behind Americans Alicia Sacramone and Nastia Liukin, and Dutch gymnast Suzanne Harmes. Zamolodchikova's low score was unpopular with the crowd, who appeared to think she should have won bronze. She scored an average of 9.318 on her two vaults, finishing behind Cheng Fei of China, Oksana Chusovitina of Uzbekistan, and Alicia Sacramone of the U.S.

2006 
Although many gymnasts retired as the new code was introduced, Zamolodchikova decided to continue competing. She struggled at her first competition of 2006, the American Cup, particularly on bars where she had a fall. An injury prevented selection for the 2006 European Championships in Volos, Greece.

Zamolodchikova helped the Russian team to a bronze medal in the team event, their first at world level since 2001, and qualified to vault finals where she was fourth. In 2006, she also competed her new vault skill, a Yurchenko laid out half-on, half-off which has an A-score of 5.6P in the new code.

After the World Championships, she competed in a few World Cup competitions winning a bronze medal on vault in the DTB-Cup in Stuttgart and two silver medals on vault and on floor in the Glasgow Grand Prix. She crowned her year with a bronze on vault at the World Cup Finals in São Paulo, Brazil.

2007 to 2009 
At the 2007 World Championships in Stuttgart, Germany, her teammate Ekaterina Kramarenko ran up and touched the vaulting table but stopped and received a 0. Zamolodchikova performed a solid vault, but the Russian team had already ended up eighth (last). In the event finals, she fell on her second vault, and finished again in eighth.

Zamolodchikova continued training in 2008 in hopes of making the Russian Olympic team for the third time, but a back injury prevented her from a better showing and she failed to do so. Instead, she competed in various World Cup events, narrowly missing a medal on floor at the 2008 World Cup Final in Madrid, where she finished fourth.

Zamolodchikova made her last competitive appearance at the 2009 University Games in Belgrade. She began her judging career at the 2009 DTB Cup in Germany.

Eponymous skills
Zamolodchikova has two eponymous skills in the Code of Points.

Floor music
1999 Worlds: "Baby Elephant Walk" - Henry Mancini
2000 Olympics: "Who's That Creepin'?/Daddy-O" - Big Bad Voodoo Daddy / Hipster Daddy-O and the Handgrenades
2002 Worlds: "Crazy Benny/Breathe" - Safri Duo / Moist
2004 Olympics: "Egyptian Symphony" - Mozart
2005 Worlds: "Crazy Benny" by Safri Duo and "Breathe" by Prodigy.

Medals

Detailed competitive scores

See also 
 List of Olympic female gymnasts for Russia
 Katya Zamolodchikova, an American drag queen who bears Elena Zamolodchikova's last name as a tribute.

References and notes

External links

ZAMTASTIC! - Unofficial Yelena Zamolodchikova Website
Picture and information
Zamolodchikova (Vault animation)

1982 births
Living people
Russian female artistic gymnasts
Gymnasts at the 2000 Summer Olympics
Gymnasts at the 2004 Summer Olympics
Olympic gymnasts of Russia
Olympic gold medalists for Russia
Olympic silver medalists for Russia
Olympic bronze medalists for Russia
World champion gymnasts
Medalists at the World Artistic Gymnastics Championships
Gymnasts from Moscow
Olympic medalists in gymnastics
Medalists at the 2004 Summer Olympics
Medalists at the 2000 Summer Olympics
Universiade medalists in gymnastics
Universiade silver medalists for Russia
Universiade bronze medalists for Russia
Medalists at the 2009 Summer Universiade
Competitors at the 2001 Goodwill Games
Goodwill Games medalists in gymnastics
Originators of elements in artistic gymnastics
European champions in gymnastics